Cedric Darnell Woodard (born September 5, 1977) is a former American football defensive tackle in the National Football League. He was drafted by the Baltimore Ravens in the sixth round of the 2000 NFL Draft. He played college football at Texas. 

Woodard's cousin, Quentin Jammer, played cornerback for the San Diego Chargers and the  Denver Broncos.

References

1977 births
Living people
American football defensive tackles
American football defensive ends
Texas Longhorns football players
Seattle Seahawks players
New Orleans Saints players
People from Bay City, Texas